Lee Se-In (born June 16, 1980) is a South Korea football player who plays for Chinese club Tianjin Songjiang. His previous club is Daejeon Citizen, Gangwon FC and Busan I'Park. He also played for Changchun Yatai in the Chinese Super League.

Club career
He scored debut and second goal consecutively came on 13 May 2009, against National League side Incheon Korail in the first round of Korean FA Cup 2009.

On 9 January 2010, Lee transferred to Changchun Yatai. On 8 July 2011, he joined Busan I'Park.

Club career statistics

References

External links
 

1980 births
Living people
South Korean footballers
South Korean expatriate footballers
Daejeon Hana Citizen FC players
Busan IPark players
Gangwon FC players
Changchun Yatai F.C. players
Tianjin Tianhai F.C. players
K League 1 players
Expatriate footballers in China
South Korean expatriate sportspeople in China
Hanyang University alumni
Chinese Super League players
China League One players
Association football defenders